The Arnold Palmer Cup—Rolex Golf Classic was a limited field invitational professional golf tournament in Japan from 1968 to 1973. The players gained entry to the tournament via a poll of golf fans, with former winners and a big-name international player also receiving an invitation. It was held at Kawasaki Kokusai Country Club near Kawasaki in Kanagawa Prefecture.

Winners

References

Defunct golf tournaments in Japan
Recurring sporting events established in 1968
Recurring sporting events disestablished in 1973
Sport in Kanagawa Prefecture
Rolex sponsorships